Joseph Karakitie Azigbo (1918–1986) was the oleogum of Okpe Kingdom in Nigeria. In the 1950s, he achieved success as an industrialist and became one of the richest men in Nigeria. During the Nigerian Civil War, most of his properties were seized or vandalized by the Nigerian army. He continued his career in business after the army but he was unable to regain the wealth and success he had achieved before the war.

Early life and career in business
Azigbo was born in Orerokpe on December 29, 1918. He worked with the United African Company UAC in Jos, Plateau state before establishing his mining business (Azigbo Brothers Limited). He soon became very successful in the mining field and became one of the richest men in Nigeria in the 1950s. He was the biggest miner of tin and columbite in the whole of West Africa, owning over 150 mining sites. At the outbreak of the Nigerian Civil War in 1967, he moved part of his business from Jos, Plateau state to Sapele, in the Niger Delta. There he established a palm produce export business. He also built a Sawmill factory on the exclusive Elder Dempster Embankment by the River Ethiope.

Seizure of property by the Nigerian army
After the war, on his return to Jos, most of Azigbo properties had either been vandalised or commandeered by the Nigerian army, others had been occupied by locals who laid claims to them. Among these was his private residence in Anglo Jos a part of which was turned into the Nigerian Air force office at the junction of Bukuru road/Miango road. His attempts to regain possession of his properties from the Nigerian government dragged on for decades. This was a huge financial blow from which chief J.K. (as he was referred to) never really recovered. He had spent most of his early adult life working and investing heavily in Jos and he must have assumed that after the war, it would be business as usual.

Return to Niger Delta
In the face of these setbacks, Azigbo left his eldest son, Raymond, in charge of the mining business and returned to the Niger Delta. Leaving his son, Raymond, in charge, turned out to be one of the worst decisions he ever made. Raymond was a pampered child; his father really loved him and made sure that he had the best in life. He never worked even for a day in his life. He lived a sheltered life and, being put in charge of Azigbo Brothers Limited brought out the worst in him. There is a saying that money brings out the worst in some people; in the case of Raymond, power and money sent him on a destructive course - he started selling off properties and company vehicles.

By the time word got to the Azigbo, a lot of financial damage was done. He quickly issued a disclaimer in most of the newspapers in northern Nigeria, including The Nigerian Standard in Jos against Raymond Azigbo. Azigbo now had a new enemy; it was neither the Nigerian government nor the locals in Jos, this was an enemy from within. Azigbo still lived a wealthy life, he had servants and stewards, some of whom migrated with the family from Jos but, he was now a shadow of his former self. He was no longer ranked as one of the richest men in the country. Gone were the days when he would be met by the governor of Plateau State at the airport on his return from trips abroad.

Death
He died on 11 July 1986 at the age of 68. He was survived by 18 children, amongst whom is Edesiri Azigbo (former Member of the Federal House of Representatives).

References

 The Nigerian Standard Newspaper, 1963, Jos, Nigeria

1918 births
1986 deaths
20th-century Nigerian businesspeople
Nigerian miners